Donna J. Shaw is a journalist, author, and associate professor at The College of New Jersey, where she serves as coordinator of the Journalism and Professional Writing program. She has served on the editorial advisory committee of TCNJ Magazine and as an advisor to The Signal, the college newspaper. A former newspaper reporter and corporate communications manager, she specializes in writing about the impact of money and politics on medical research.

Education 
Donna Shaw received her bachelor's degrees in English and journalism from The Pennsylvania State University. She later earned Biotechnology Fellowships at the University of Maryland's Knight Center for Specialized Journalism and at Virginia Commonwealth University. As a Knight-Bagehot Fellow at Columbia University, Shaw earned her Master of Science in journalism and a certificate in economics and business journalism (concentration in healthcare economics).

Teaching 
Donna Shaw teaches a variety of journalism courses, including Introduction to Journalism; News Editing and Production; Feature Writing; Computer Assisted Reporting/Research Methods; Beats and Deadlines; Media Law; Press History; Future of the News; and Topics in Journalism: Science Journalism.

Publications 
 “Wikipedia in the Newsroom.” American Journalism Review, February/March 2008: 40–45.
 “A Fading Taboo.” American Journalism Review, June/July 2007: 34–39.
 “Really Local.” American Journalism Review, April/May 2007: 54–57.
 “Slow to React.” American Journalism Review, April/May 2007: 12–13.
 “Online Scoops.” American Journalism Review, Oct/Nov 2006, 58–60.
 “The Pulitzer Cartel.” American Journalism Review, Oct/Nov 2006, 40–47.
 “Remaking the Front Page.” American Journalism Review, June/July 2006, 25–31.
 “Dilemma of Interest.” American Journalism Review, Feb/March 2006: 56–61.
 “The World Needs What We Do.” American Journalism Review, Feb/March 2006: 25.
 “Global Guinea Pigs: Ethical Issues in Drug Testing.” The Reuters Forum Journal, Spring 1999: 18–21. 
 During her 17 years writing for The Philadelphia Inquirer, Shaw authored hundreds of bylined articles.

Awards 
Donna Shaw was nominated by The Philadelphia Inquirer three times for a Pulitzer Prize, twice for health reporting.
She was also awarded a Keystone Press Award, Public Service/Investigative, for The Philadelphia Inquirer series, “Blood, Money and AIDS”. She won the Journalism Service Award from the Delaware Valley Chapter of the National Hemophilia Foundation.

References 
 TCNJ English Dept. Faculty
 Donna Shaw Homepage
 Columbia University Knight Bagehot Fellowship
 American Journalism Review. Index of Articles By Donna Shaw

American women journalists
Columbia University Graduate School of Journalism alumni
Knight-Bagehot Fellows
Pennsylvania State University alumni
The College of New Jersey faculty
Living people
20th-century births
Year of birth missing (living people)
American women academics
21st-century American women